Resiquimod (R-848) is a drug that acts as an immune response modifier, and has antiviral and antitumour activity. It is used as a topical gel in the treatment of skin lesions such as those caused by the herpes simplex virus and cutaneous T cell lymphoma, and as an adjuvant to increase the effectiveness of vaccines. In an animal disease model, systemic administration of resiquimod-loaded nanoparticles has been shown to improve response rates to cancer immunotherapy with a checkpoint inhibitor through stimulation of tumor-associated macrophages. It has several mechanisms of action, being both an agonist for toll-like receptor 7 and 8, and an upregulator of the opioid growth factor receptor.
On 28 April 2016, orphan designation (EU/3/16/1653) was granted by the European Commission to Galderma R&D, France for resiquimod to be used in the treatment of cutaneous T-cell lymphoma.

See also
 Imiquimod
 Gardiquimod

References

Anti-herpes virus drugs
Antineoplastic drugs
Imidazoquinolines